Daniel Rincón Yagüe (born 7 January 2003) is a Spanish tennis player.

Rincón has a career high ATP singles ranking of 452, achieved on 25 July 2022. He also has a career high ATP doubles ranking of 744 also achieved on 25 July 2022.

Rincón won the 2021 US Open boys' singles title, defeating Shang Juncheng 6–2, 7–6(8–6)  in the final. He also reached the 2021 Wimbledon Boys' Doubles final alongside Abedallah Shelbayh, but was then defeated 3–6, 4–6 to Edas Butvilas and Alejandro Manzanera Pertusa.

Junior Grand Slam finals

Singles: 1 (1 title)

Doubles: 1 (1 runner-up)

ATP Challenger and ITF Futures finals

Singles: 8 (4–4)

Doubles: 5 (3–2)

References

External links

2003 births
Living people
Spanish male tennis players
US Open (tennis) junior champions
Grand Slam (tennis) champions in boys' singles